This is a list of some notable people affiliated with University of Bologna.

This is a dynamic list and may never be able to satisfy particular standards for completeness. You can help by adding missing items with reliable sources.

Notable alumni

Academics 

 Umberto Eco, Italian semiotician, philosopher and writer

Clergy and Biblical scholars 

 Archbishop Thomas Becket;
 Cardinal Alberto Bolognetti
 Cardinal Paolo Burali d'Arezzo;
 Pope Alexander VI
 Pope Gregory XIII (Ugo Boncompagni)
 Pope Gregory XV
 Pope Innocent IX
 Gabriele Paleotti
 Saint Charles Borromeo, archbishop of Milan
 Henry of Susa (Hostiensis)

Presidents, prime ministers, and other heads of national government 
 Adone Zoli, former Prime Minister of Italy.
 Álvaro de Figueroa, former Prime Minister of Spain.
 Joaquín Chapaprieta, former Prime Minister of Spain.

Cabinet members 

 Patrizio Bianchi, Minister of Public Education in the Draghi Cabinet
 Remo Gaspari, Minister of Relationships with the Parliament and Minister of Public Function in the  Bettino Craxi and Giulio Andreotti Cabinet.
 Piero Gnudi, Minister of Tourism and Sports in the Monti cabinet. 
 Juan Fernando López Aguilar, former Minister of Justice - Spain.
 Fawziya Abikar Nur, Minister for Health and Social Care - Somalia.

Diplomats and government officials

Senators, Representatives, and other politicians 

 Brando Benifei, Italian politician
 Anna Maria Bernini, Italian politician and lawyer
 Pier Luigi Bersani, Italian politician
 , Italian politician and lawyer
Lanfranco De Franco, Italian politician and lawyer
 Maurizio Fugatti, Italian politician
 Edoardo Gaffeo, Italian politician
 Gian Luca Galletti, Italian politician
 Andrea Gnassi, Italian politician
 Sandro Gozi, Italian politician
 Matteo Lepore, Italian politician & mayor of Bologna
 Giacomo Matteotti
 , Italian politician
 , Italian politician
 Elly Schlein, Italian politician
Sandra Zampa, Italian politician
 Pablo Iglesias Turrión, Spain politician
 Pier Ferdinando Casini, Italian politician
 Gianni Cuperlo, Italian politician
 Virginio Merola, Italian politician & former mayor of Bologna
 Michelangelo Baracchi Bonvicini, President of Atomium - European Institute for Science, Media and Democracy.

Lawyers and judges 

 Daria de Pretis, Italian jurist, Constitutional Judge of the Constitutional Court of Italy. 
 Manuel Olivencia, lawyer and academic;
 Bartolus de Saxoferrato, Italian law professor and one of the most prominent continental jurists of Medieval Roman Law.

Businessman & Economist 

 Corrado Gini, Italian statistician, demographer and sociologist who developed the Gini coefficient/ratio.
 Diego Della Valle, chairman of the Italian leather goods company Tod's
 Stefano Domenicali, CEO of Formula One Group and former CEO of Italian sports car manufacturer Automobili Lamborghini S.p.A.
 Raul Gardini, Italian agri-business and chemicals tycoon.
 Mauro Moretti, former CEO and general manager of Leonardo S.p.A.
 Elena Panaritis, Economist.
 Alberto Giovannini, Italian Macroeconomist and Financial Economist
 Fabrizio Zilibotti,  Italian economist and Professor of International and Development Economics at Yale University

Nobel Prize winners 
 Guglielmo Marconi, 1909 Nobel Prize in Physics and the inventor of radio.

Astronauts and Astronomer 

 Andrea Boattini, Italian astronomer and a prolific discoverer of minor planets and comets.
 Isabella M. Gioia, Italian astrophysicist.

Engineers, inventors, and scientists   

 Mauro Forghieri, Formula One racing car designer. 
 Pier Luigi Nervi, Italian Structural engineer and architect.
 Ulisse Aldrovandi;
 Laura Bassi, the world's first woman to earn a university chair in a scientific field of studies
 Chryssostomos Chatgilialoglu, Greek-Italian chemist 

 Nicolaus Copernicus, formulator of the heliocentric universal model;
 Enzo Ferrari, Italian racing driver, engineer and entrepreneur
 Luigi Galvani;
 Guglielmo Marconi, Italian inventor and radio pioneer
 Pietro Mengoli;
 Paracelsus, founder of the discipline of toxicology;
 Augusto Righi, pioneer in the study of electromagnetism
 Carlo Rovelli, Italian theoretical physicist
 Carlo Severini, Italian mathematician
 Lazzaro Spallanzani, Italian priest, biologist and physiologist
 Luca Benini, computer scientist and educator
 Gregorio Ricci-Curbastro, Italian mathematician and the inventor of tensor calculus.
 Cristina Roccati, Italian physicist.
 Bruno Rossi, Italian experimental physicist.
 Juan Carlos Izpisua Belmonte, Spanish biochemist and developmental biologist.
 Enrico Marconi, Italian-Polish architect.
 Adamo Boari, Italian Art Nouveau and Art Deco civil engineer and architect.
 Cesare Emiliani, Italian-American scientist, geologist, micropaleontologist, and paleoceanography.

Physicians    

 Julius Caesar Aranzi, the pioneer human anatomists and surgeons.
 Ruggero Oddi, Italian physiologist and anatomist.
 Marcello Malpighi;
 Gasparo Tagliacozzi, pioneer of plastic and reconstructive surgery
 Giovanni Aldini, Italian physician.
 Turisanus, physician.
 Taddeo Alderotti, Italian doctor and professor of medicine.
 Ismail Boçari,  Albanian professor of medicine.
 Maria Dalle Donne, Italian physician and a former director at the University of Bologna.
 Hugo Spadafora, Italian and Panamanian physician.
 Justus Velsius, Dutch physician, and mathematician.

Entertainers 

 Michelangelo Antonioni;
 Carlo Goldoni, Italian playwright
 Emilio Solfrizzi, Italian actor and comedian.

Authors and artists 

 Dante Alighieri, Italian poet, writer and philosopher
 Leon Battista Alberti;
Silvia Balducci, Italian journalist at RAI
 Pico della Mirandola;
 Albrecht Dürer, German painter, printmaker and theorist
 Erasmus of Rotterdam
Milena Gabanelli, Italian journalist and television host
Riccardo Iacona, Italian journalist 
 Carlo Lucarelli
 Giovanni Pascoli
 Pier Paolo Pasolini;
 Petrarch;
 Pupi Avati, Italian film director, producer, and screenwriter.
 Carlo Mazzacurati, Italian film director and screenwriter 
Luca Rosini, Italian journalist 
 Torquato Tasso;
 Silvia Avallone, Italian novelist and poet.
 Chiara Gamberale, Italian writer, television and radio presenter.
 Vittorio Sgarbi, Italian art critic, art historian and writer.
 Andrea Pazienza,  Italian comics artist and painter.

Other notables 

 Anna M. Borghi, Italian cognitive psychologist
 Irnerius, founder of the School of Glossators
 Valerio Massimo Manfredi, Italian historian, writer, archaeologist and journalist. 
 Veronica Yoko Plebani, Italian Paralympic athlete. 
 Pierluigi Collina,  Chairman of the FIFA referees committee

Philosopher 

 Francesco Algarotti, Italian Philosopher, poet, art critic and art collector.
 Francesco Maria Zanotti, Italian philosopher and writer.

Notable faculty 

 Maria Gaetana Agnesi
 Leon Battista Alberti
 Ulisse Aldrovandi
 Camillo Baldi
 Augusto Barbera
 Hamida Barmaki
 Laura Bassi
 Pier Cesare Bori
 Bulgarus
 Gualtiero Calboli
 Gabriella Campadelli-Fiume
 Girolamo Cardano
 Giosuè Carducci
 Giovanni Cassini
 Manuel Chrysoloras
 Giacomo Ciamician
 Nicolaus Copernicus
 Ignazio Danti
 Lippo Bartolomeo Dardi
 Giovanni Della Casa
 Giovanni de' Marignolli
 Ivano Dionigi
 Yuriy Drohobych (also known as Georgius de Drohobycz)
 Albrecht Dürer
 Umberto Eco
 Luigi Galvani
 Carlo Goldoni
 Bettisia Gozzadini
 Sylvester Gozzolini
 Gratian
 Guido Guinizelli
 Henry of Susa (Hostiensis)
 Irnerius
 Beppo Levi
 Girolamo Maggi
 Giovanni Antonio Magini
 Marcello Malpighi
 Virgilio Malvezzi
 Martinus Gosia
 Pietro Mengoli
 Niall Ó Glacáin
 Patriarch Heraclius of Jerusalem
 Paracelsus
 Giovanni Pascoli
 Pier Paolo Pasolini
 Paul, Dominican martyr
 Francesco Petrarca (also known as Petrarch)
 Giovanni Pico della Mirandola
 Romano Prodi
 Augusto Righi
 Pellegrino Rossi
 William of Saliceto
 Coluccio Salutati
 Benvenutus Scotivoli
 Francesco Selmi
 William of Tyre
 Özalp Babaoğlu

References

University of Bologna
University of Bologna alumni
Academic staff of the University of Bologna